Richard Yung (born 22 September 1947) is a member of the Senate of France, representing the constituency of French citizens living abroad.  He was a member of the Socialist Party from 1974 to 2017, that he left to join La République En Marche! in June 2017 .

References
Page on the Senate website

1947 births
Living people
People from Amboise
Unified Socialist Party (France) politicians
Socialist Party (France) politicians
La République En Marche! politicians
French Senators of the Fifth Republic
Senators of French citizens living abroad
Sciences Po alumni
Politicians from Centre-Val de Loire